The Eastbourne Gazette, commonly known as just The Gazette, is a weekly tabloid newspaper, printed on Wednesdays and published since 1859 in Eastbourne, England.

History
The Gazette was the town's first newspaper. Nowadays, the paper is edited and created by Beckett Newspapers, based in Eastbourne, and printed by Johnston Press at their headquarters in Hilsea, Portsmouth. Aleister Crowley once edited a chess column for the paper. The Gazette was the newspaper that the fictional Private Cheeseman from Dad's Army was a correspondent for.

Sister newspaper
The Gazette also has a sister newspaper, owned by Beckett Newspapers, called the Eastbourne Herald. The Herald is printed on a Friday and is more expensive than the Gazette. Eastbourne is one of the few remaining towns in the UK which has a midweek paid-for newspaper as well as an end-of-week title.

References

External links
 Eastbourne Gazette website

Newspapers published in Sussex
Eastbourne
Newspapers established in 1859
1859 establishments in England